The Level is a British crime drama, which began broadcasting on ITV on 30 September 2016. The six-part series focuses on DS Nancy Devlin (Karla Crome), a detective with the National Crime Division, who is assigned to Brighton CID to investigate the murder of Frank Le Saux (Philip Glenister), a corrupt businessman with whom she has been associated in the past. Having been present at the scene of the murder, Nancy struggles to keep her involvement in the case a secret, whilst working under the watchful eye of boss DCI Michelle Newman (Lindsey Coulson). The series was predominantly filmed in and around the streets of Brighton. The series received consistent viewing figures throughout its run, and actress Karla Crome has suggested the possibility of a second series.

Cast 
Main cast
 Karla Crome as DS Nancy Devlin, National Crime Division
 Laura Haddock as Hayley Svrcek, Frank's daughter
 Lindsey Coulson as DCI Michelle Newman, East Sussex Police
 Rob James-Collier as DS Kevin O'Dowd, National Crime Division
 Noel Clarke as DS Sean 'Gunner' Martin, East Sussex Police
 Amanda Burton as Cherie Le Saux, Frank's wife
 Joe Absolom as Shay Nash, corrupt businessman and Hayley's ex
 Geoff Bell as Duncan Elliot, partner of Le Saux haulage
 Lorne MacFayden as Darryl Quinn, Frank's right-hand man
 Gary Lewis as Gil Devlin, Nancy's father and former detective

Recurring characters
 Philip Glenister as Frank Le Saux, corrupt businessman
 Jane Hazlegrove as DC Gayle Vincent, East Sussex Police
 Cian Binchy as Tate Le Saux, Frank's son
 Suzanne Packer as Teresa Devlin, Nancy's mother
 Kelly Harrison as Delia Bradley, Frank's lover
 Rupert Procter as Theo Ketler, Frank's accountant

Plot 
One night, Frank Le Saux (Philip Glenister), a corrupt businessman, arranges to meet DS Nancy Devlin (Karla Crome), a National Crime Division detective who has been protecting him from prosecution on several occasions. However, their meeting is cut short when they are interrupted by the arrival of an unknown gunman. Frank is shot dead, and Nancy receives a wound from a ricochet. The Brighton CID of East Sussex Police are assigned to investigate the case. Boss DCI Michelle Newman (Lindsey Coulson) arranges for DS Devlin to be assigned to the case, unaware of her being present at the scene of the murder. Devlin is initially paired with DS Sean 'Gunner' Martin (Noel Clarke), but friction occurs between the pair, forcing Newman to second Nancy's fellow NCD detective Kevin O'Dowd (Rob James-Collier) to the case.

Nancy struggles to hide her involvement in Frank's activities. Her friendship with Frank's daughter, Hayley (Laura Haddock) makes her situation increasingly difficult. However, it soon transpires that the blight of the team's investigation appears to a mole within their ranks. Nancy suspects that Gunner may be the leak, but during a late-night visit to O'Dowd's hotel room, she discovers a series of surveillance photos that disappeared earlier in the day. Whilst trying to deal with the pressures of the investigation, Nancy is forced to help her mentally ill mother, Teresa (Suzanne Packer), but soon discovers that her mum has been shielding a life-changing secret for twenty years - that Nancy is secretly Frank's daughter.

Episodes

Series 1 (2016)

References

External links

2016 British television series debuts
2010s British drama television series
ITV television dramas
British crime drama television series
2010s British mystery television series
English-language television shows
2010s British crime television series
Detective television series
Television shows set in Brighton